The 2009 Houston elections took place on May 9, June 12, and November 3, 2009. All City Council Posts, the City Controller, and the Mayor all had elections. All positions are non-partisan.

Mayor

Candidates listed in order of how they appear on the official ballot.

City Councilman Peter Brown
Amanda Ulman
Luis Ullrich
Dan Cupp
Education Trustee Roy Morales
City Controller Annise Parker
Former City Attorney Gene Locke

City Controller

Incumbent Controller Annise Parker was unable to run for a fourth term due to term limits. She is ran for Mayor.

Candidates
City Councilman Ronald Green
City Councilwoman Pam Holm
City Councilman M. J. Khan

City Council At-large 1

Incumbent Peter Brown did not be seek a third term because he was running for Mayor.

Candidates
Lonnie Allsbrooks
Brad Batteau
Don Cook
Stephen Costello
Karen Derr
Education Trustee Herman Litt
Kenneth Perkins
Rick Rodriguez

Endorsements

Derr's endorsers include:
 State Representative Jessica Farrar

Litt's endorsers include:
 State Representative Alma Allen
 Former Congressman Chris Bell
 State Representative Ellen Cohen
 Former State Representative Paul Colbert
 Former Mayor Fred Hofheinz
 Former Mayor Bob Lanier
 City Councilwoman Melissa Noriega
 Former State Representative Rick Noriega
 Former City Councilman Gordon Quan
 Harris County Attorney Vince Ryan
 Former Ambassador Arthur Schechter
 Former State Representative Sue Schechter

Rodriguez's endorsers include:
 State Representative Carol Alvarado
 State Senator Mario Gallegos
 City Councilman James Rodriguez
 Former City Councilman Felix Fraga

Results

City Council At-large 2

Incumbent Sue Lovell will be seeking a third term.

Candidates
Andrew Burks
Michael Griffin
Incumbent City Councilwoman Sue Lovell
Rozzy Shorter

City Council At-large 3

Incumbent Melissa Noriega will be seeking a second full term. So far she is unopposed.

Candidates
Incumbent City Councilwoman Melissa Noriega

City Council At-large 4

Incumbent Ronald Green will be unable to run for a fourth term due to term limits. He is running for City Controller.

Candidates
Clarence Bradford
Noel Freeman
Curtis Garmon
Deborah Shafto

Endorsements

Freeman's endorsers include:
City Councilmember Melissa Noriega
City Controller Annise Parker

City Council At-large 5

Incumbent Jolanda Jones will be seeking a second term.

Candidates
Jack Christie
 Dr. Davetta Daniels
Incumbent City Councilwoman Jolanda Jones
 Carlos Obando

Endorsements

Jones's endorsers include:
 Mayor Bill White
 Former Mayor Lee Brown
 Former Congressman Chris Bell
 State Senator Mario Gallegos
 State Senator John Whitmire
 State Representative Carol Alvarado
 State Representative Garnet Coleman
 State Representative Jessica Farrar
 State Representative Senfronia Thompson
 Former City Councilmember Rob Todd

City Council District A

Incumbent Toni Lawrence will be unable to run for a fourth term due to term limits.

Candidates
Jeff Downing
Lane Lewis
Amy Peck
Darrel Rodriguez
Bob Schoellkopf
Brenda Stardig
Alex Wathen

Results

City Council District B

Incumbent Jarvis Johnson will be seeking a third term. So far he is unopposed.

Candidates
Roger Bowden
Incumbent City Councilman Jarvis Johnson

Results

City Council District C

Incumbent Anne Clutterbuck will be seeking a third term.

Candidates
Incumbent City Councilwoman Anne Clutterbuck
Randolph Locke

There also is an official write-in candidate for the District C race:
Alfred Molison

Results

City Council District D

Incumbent Wanda Adams will be seeking a second term.

Candidates
Incumbent City Councilwoman Wanda Adams
Larry McKinzie
Jordan Otis

Results

City Council District E

Incumbent Mike Sullivan will be seeking a second term.

Candidates
Wayne Garrison
Incumbent City Councilman Mike Sullivan

Results

City Council District F

Incumbent M. J. Khan will be unable to run for a fourth term due to term limits. He is running for City Controller.

Candidates
Peter Acquaro
Lewis Cook
Joe Chow
Al Hoang
Robert Kane
Khalid Khan
Mike Laster

Results

City Council District G

Incumbent Pam Holm will be unable to run for a fourth term due to term limits. She is running for City Controller.

Candidates
George Foulard
Dexter Handy
Oliver Pennington
Richard Sedita
Education Trustee Mills Worsham

Results

City Council District H

Before the end of his term, Adrian Garcia resigned to become the Harris County sheriff. After a crowded special election, Edward Gonzalez and Maverick Welsh went into a runoff. Gonzalez won the runoff and now is going to general election unopposed.

Candidates

Special election
Gonzalo Camacho
Yolanda Navarro Flores
James Partsch-Galvan
Lupe Garcia
Edward Gonzalez
Hugo Mojica
Rick Rodriguez
Maverick Welsh
Larry Williams

General election
Incumbent City Councilman Edward Gonzalez (Democratic)

Results

City Council District I

Incumbent James Rodriguez will be seeking a second term. So far he is unopposed.

Candidates
Incumbent City Councilman James Rodriguez

Results

References

See also

elections
Houston
Government of Houston
Non-partisan elections